Be Inteha (English: Limitless) is a 2017 Pakistani drama which aired on 29 March 2017 on Urdu 1. Naveen Waqar, Sami Khan, and Agha Ali are the main cast of the series. The drama is produced by Humayun Saeed and Shahzad Nasib under their production banner Six Sigma Plus.

Plot
Bisma (Naveen Waqar) has always dreamt of romance and love but they are missing from her relationship with her fiancé-to-be, Ali. Luckily, fate is ready to make her dreams come true when she comes face-to-face with a vivacious young photographer, Shehryar. Lives are turned around and lovers realize that they must contend against known and unknown forces to preserve their bond of love.
Bisma and Shehryar get married, despite earning great displeasure from Bisma's father though Bisma's mother accepts the relationship and Shehryar's mother is the one who supported them throughout their journey. Ali is heartbroken but he stays in touch with Bisma's younger sister Zara (Ghana Ali) through social media while Ali is abroad. Bisma and Sherry live a joyful life until Sherry discovers that he is suffering from cancer.
The whole family, including Bisma's father supports Sherry but he passes away. A shattered Bisma gets a new ray of hope when she discovers that she is pregnant. Meanwhile, Zara and Ali get married with Bisma's help. Bisma gives birth to a son Ashar and marries Zaid (Agha Ali) several years after Shehryar's death.

Cast
 Naveen Waqar as Bisma (main lead)
 Sami Khan as Shehryar/Sherry (Dead) (main lead) Bisma's husband and true love
 Agha Ali as Zaid, Bisma's second husband 
 Saba Hameed as Zaid's mother
 Fahad Rehmani as Zaid's Friend
 Faris Shafi as Ali: Bisma's brother-in-law and ex-fiánce, Zara's husband 
 Ghana Ali as Zara: Bisma's younger sister, Ali's wife
 Rubina Ashraf as Sherry's mother
 Mariam Mirza as Ali's mother
 Waseem Abbas as Bisma and Zara's father
 Asma Omer
 Ahmed Murtaza
Shaista Jabeen
Zubi Majeed

References 

Pakistani drama television series
2017 Pakistani television series debuts
2017 Pakistani television series endings
Urdu-language television shows
Urdu 1 original programming
Urdu 1